Coccothrinax camagueyana is a palm which is endemic to east central Cuba.

Henderson et al. (1995) considered C. camagueyana to be a synonym of Coccothrinax gundlachii.

References

camagueyana
Trees of Cuba
Plants described in 1981